Mini's First Time is a 2006 satiric neo-noir film written and directed by Nick Guthe and produced by Trigger Street Productions. It was screened at the Tribeca Film Festival on May 1, 2006 and had a limited release on July 14, 2006. It was released on DVD on October 24, 2006 by HBO Films.

Plot
Mini Drogues (Nikki Reed) is a clever and adventurous high school senior who is bored with her life. Mini prizes her "unique experiences" (she calls them "firsts"). For excitement, and to add to her list of firsts, Mini decides to try being a call girl. Her first client, however, has a guilty conscience and can't carry through with the act, which disappoints Mini. Her second client is decidedly more exciting: her stepfather Martin (Alec Baldwin). Martin is initially shocked when he learns of her identity (he initially blindfolded himself during intercourse per Mini's request), but soon a torrid love affair blossoms between the two.

In order to be together, Mini and Martin concoct a plan to have Mini's mother Diane (Carrie-Anne Moss) declared insane. When their plan fails, Mini convinces Martin to murder Diane, despite his initial resistance to the idea. They attempt to make it appear that Diane committed suicide, but they soon attract the attention of a detective (Luke Wilson) who believes that Mini and Martin killed her. A nosy neighbor, Mike (Jeff Goldblum), is sexually obsessed with Mini, and when Martin learns that Mini had gone to Mike's house and had received sexual pictures from him, he and Mike get into a fight. Mini arrives to find Martin standing over the neighbor, ready to beat him into unconsciousness, and when the police arrive they arrest Martin.

Mini visits Martin in jail and admits that the sexual pictures sent were actually from her in order to get Martin to think that the neighbor sent them. She also reveals that she assumed the police would eventually believe he killed Diane (since he was the more likely perpetrator). Mini, therefore, ends up getting away with murder, and inherits her mother's fortune. The film ends with Mini giving a valedictorian speech, even though she is a C student; the school gave her straight A's out of sympathy for her mother's death. She offers advice to the graduating class about how to live a good life, that perversely alludes to her crimes without making her look too suspicious. The detective is present at the speech, clearly still suspicious of Mini, but knowing that he will probably never be able to prove that she was guilty of murdering her mother.

Cast
Alec Baldwin as Martin Tennan
Nikki Reed as Minerva "Mini" Drogues
Carrie-Anne Moss as Diane Drogues-Tennan
Jeff Goldblum as Mike Rudell
Luke Wilson as Det. Dwight Garson
Svetlana Metkina as Jelena Mariskova-Flachsman
David Andriole as Charles Mather
Mark Deklin as Ian Boyd
Sprague Grayden as Kayla
Rick Fox as Fabrizio
Joel McHale as Hosted

References

External links

Mini's First Time on Trigger Street Productions

2006 films
2000s crime comedy films
2006 black comedy films
American black comedy films
American neo-noir films
Bold Films films
Matricide in fiction
2006 comedy films
2000s English-language films
2000s American films
American crime comedy films